Northern District is one of six administrative districts of Riga, the capital of Latvia.

Administrative divisions 
The Northern District consists of several arrondissements:
 Čiekurkalns (partly the Vidzeme District)
 Jaunciems
 Kundziņsala
 Mangaļsala
 Mežaparks
 Mīlgrāvis
 Pētersala-Andrejsala
 Sarkandaugava
 Trīsciems
 Vecāķi
 Vecdaugava
 Vecmīlgrāvis

Education 
There are 12 secondary education establishments (schools) in the Northern District:

References 

Administrative divisions of Riga